Speech is the vocal form of human communication.

Speech or speaking may also refer to:
 Spoken language
 Discourse
 Animal language, forms of animal communication that are considered to show similarities to human language
Talking animal or speaking animal,  any non-human animal which produces sounds or gestures resembling those of a human
 Connected speech in linguistics, a continuous sequence of sounds forming utterances or conversations in spoken language
 Public speaking,  a process of speaking to a group of people in a structured, deliberate manner
 Speech imitation, the saying by one individual of the spoken vocalizations made by another individual
 Speech synthesis, the artificial production of human speech language
 Right speech, a component of the Noble Eightfold Path in Buddhism

People 
 Speech (rapper) (born 1968), an American rapper and musician
 Speech Debelle (born 1983), a British rapper and Mercury Prize winner

See also 
 The Speech (disambiguation)
 List of speeches
 Speak (disambiguation)
 Speech sound